Hui Shi (370–310 BCE), or Huizi ("Master Hui"), was a Chinese philosopher during the Warring States period. He was a representative of the School of Names (Logicians), and is famous for ten paradoxes about the relativity of time and space, for instance, "I set off for Yue (southeastern China) today and came there yesterday."

Philosophy

The Yiwenzhi attributes a philosophical work to Hui Shi, but it is no longer extant, probably being lost prior to the Tang dynasty. For this reason, knowledge of his philosophy relies on the several Chinese classic texts that refer to him, including the Zhan Guo Ce, Lüshi Chunqiu, Han Feizi, Xunzi, and most frequently, the Zhuangzi. Nine Zhuangzi chapters mention Hui Shi, calling him "Huizi" 26 times and "Hui Shi" 9 times. "Under Heaven" (chapter 33), which summarizes Warring States philosophies, contains all of the latter 9 references by name.

Belonging to the School of Names, Hui Shi's philosophy is characterised by arguments centred around the relativity of the concepts of sameness and difference. He frequently used analogies and paradoxes to convey his arguments.

The Ten Theses
The final chapter of the Zhuangzi,  ( 'Under Heaven') claims that Hui Shi held ten main opinions, referred to as "The Ten Theses" or "The Ten Paradoxes", and lists them as follows:

 The largest thing has nothing beyond it; it is called the One of largeness. The smallest thing has nothing within it; it is called the One of smallness.
 That which has no thickness cannot be piled up; yet it is a thousand li in dimension.
 Heaven is as low as earth; mountains and marshes are on the same level.
 The sun at noon is the sun setting. The thing born is the thing dying.
 Great similarities are different from little similarities; these are called the little similarities and differences. The ten thousand things are all similar and are all different; these are called the great similarities and differences.
 The southern region has no limit and yet has a limit.
 I set off for Yueh today and came there yesterday.
 Linked rings can be separated.
 I know the center of the world: it is north of Yen and south of Yueh.
 Let love embrace the ten thousand things; Heaven and earth are a single body.

The list in the  does not, however, explain how Hui Shi argued these theses. Though the theses seem haphazard, and the list laking in logical structure, Chris Fraser argues that they can be divided into four natural groups:
 The basic principles (theses 1, 5 and 10) – These are non-paradoxical statements of Hui Shi's ontological doctrines. Thesis 1 presents the relativity of the concept of oneness. At the extremes, the One can be interpreted as the smallest possible part, with nothing inside it, or the largest possible whole, with everything inside it. (The idea of a "smallest thing" is sometimes used to argue that Hui Shi was an atomist, but Fraser proposes that it might be a geometrical point rather than an atom.) Thesis 5 represents the claim that sameness and difference are also relative and perspective-dependent, and that two things can be the same in one way while differing in another. Finally, thesis 10 contains an ethical element along side an ontological one, suggesting that, if all things can be considered to form one whole, us included, we should treat all things with the same love with which we treat ourselves.
 The paradoxes of infinitesimals and part-whole relations (theses 2 and 8) – Thesis 2 presents the paradox of the infinite divisibility of things into dimensionless, infinitesimal points (the "smallest things" from thesis 1) despite the seeming impossibility of adding together dimensionless objects to yield anything with thickness. Thesis 8 is obscure, but Fraser suggests it could be explained through thesis 2: if the rings are formed entirely of infinitesimal points, which take up no space, then there should be nothing there to prevent the rings from passing through each other. 
 The paradoxes of spatial relations (theses 3, 6, and 9) – Thesis 3 applies the relativism of thesis 5 to spatial relations: if "the ten thousand things are all similar and are all different", then there is a certain scale or perspective from which the apparently great distance between heaven and earth is reduced to nothing. Theses 6 and 9 concern the indexicality of the cardinal directions, i.e., the meaning of "south" changes the further one travels south. 
 The paradoxes of temporal relations (theses 4 and 7) – Thesis 4 can be explained through the multiplicity of perspectives: while the sun appears high here, to someone further east it must appear to be setting. Similarly, from the moment a thing is born, even as it grows, it is at the same time approaching its death. Thesis 7 is unclear, but also seems to relate to the relativity of time.

Miscellaneous Paradoxes

Another passage from the  attributes 21 more paradoxes to Hui Shi and other members of the School of Names, which they are said to have used in their debates. Compared to the Ten Theses listed above, they appear even more absurd and unsolvable:

The last statement in particular, "if from a stick a foot long you every day take the half of it, in a myriad ages it will not be exhausted" is notable for its resemblance to the Dichotomy paradox described by Zeno of Elea. Zeno's paradox takes the example of a runner on a finite race track, arguing that, because runner must reach the halfway point before they can reach the finish line, and the length of the track can be divided into halves infinitely many times, it should be impossible for them to reach the finish line in a finite amount of time. The Mohist canon appears to propose a solution to this paradox by arguing that in moving across a measured length, the distance is not covered in successive fractions of the length, but in one stage. Due to the lack of surviving works, most of the other paradoxes listed are difficult to interpret.

Fondness for Analogies 

A dialogue in the Shuo Yuan portrays Hui Shi as having a tendency to overuse analogies (which can also be translated as "illustrative examples") with Hui Shi justifying this habit with the claim that communication is impossible without analogies:

A. C. Graham argues that this philosophical position suggests some affinity between Hui Shi and the Mohists, in their shared opinion that "the function of names is to communicate that an object is like the objects one knows by the name"

Relation to Zhuangzi

Most of the other Zhuangzi passages portray Hui Shi (Huizi) as a friendly rival of Zhuangzi. Hui Shi acts as an intellectual foil who argues the alternative viewpoint, or criticizes the Daoist perspective, often with moments of humor. The best known of the Zhuang-Hui dialogues concerns the subjectivity of happiness.

According to these ancient Daoist stories, Zhuangzi and Hui Shi remained friendly rivals until death.

Chad Hansen (2003:146) interprets this lament as "the loss of a philosophical partnership, of two like-minded but disagreeing intellectual companions engaged in the joys of productive philosophical argument."

Notes

References
 Hansen, Chad. "The Relatively Happy Fish", Asian Philosophy, 13 (2003): 145-164.
 Kou Pao-koh. Deux sophistes chinois:Houei Che et Kong -souen Long. Paris, 1953.
 Lucas Thierry. "Hui Shih and Kung Sun Lung: an approach from contemporary logic", Journal of Chinese Philosophy, 20 (1993): 211-255.
 Moritz R. Hui Shi und die Entwicklung des philosophischen Denkens im alten China. Berlin, 1973.
 Solomon B.S. "The assumptions of Hui Shih", Monumenta Serica, 28 (1969): 1-40.
 Watson, Burton, tr. 1968. The Complete Works of Chuang Tzu. New York: Columbia University Press.

External links

 Fraser, Chris. "School of Names: 5. Hui Shi" and "Life of Hui Shi", Stanford Encyclopedia of Philosophy, 2005.

Chinese logicians
Mohism
School of Names
Zhou dynasty philosophers